Streblosiopsis is a genus of flowering plants belonging to the family Rubiaceae.

Its native range is Borneo.

Species:
 Streblosiopsis cupulata Valeton

References

Rubiaceae
Rubiaceae genera